Buffalo AirStation is the name given to a series of wireless LAN equipment sold by Buffalo Technology.

Products 

 Residential gateways
 Wireless LAN cards

Use with third party firmware 
Many of Buffalo's residential gateways use Broadcom microprocessor chipsets, allowing a variety of third party open source firmware to be installed.  Some of their most recent routers with Atheros-based chipsets are shipped by Buffalo with a branded version of DD-WRT already installed.

CSIRO controversy 
In late November 2007, Buffalo announced they would temporarily stop supplying wireless LAN products in the USA due to the ongoing lawsuit filed by the 802.11a, 802.11g and 802.11n patent holder CSIRO.

Buffalo Routers

WAP series

WBR series

WCR series

WHR series

WLA series

WLI series

WVR series

WYR series

WZR series

See also 
 List of wireless router firmware projects

References

External links 
 Buffalo

Networking hardware
Hardware routers
Wireless networking
Linux-based devices